Piotrowice  is a village in the administrative district of Gmina Karczew, within Otwock County, Masovian Voivodeship, in east-central Poland.

As of 2013, the population was approximately 352. In the village are Voivodeship Road 801 and National Road 50. From 1975 to 1998 the village was in Warsaw Voivodeship.

Gallery

References

Piotrowice